Spice World Mall (now Smart Bharat Mall) is a shopping mall in Noida, Uttar Pradesh, India. The mall was opened in 2013 and is adjacent with Noida Cricket Stadium.

See also
 The Great India Place
 List of shopping malls in India

References

External links
 Official website
 Spice Cinemas

Economy of Noida
Buildings and structures in Noida
Shopping malls in Uttar Pradesh
Shopping malls established in 2013
2013 establishments in Uttar Pradesh